Macaya (floruit 1802), was a Kongolese-born Haitian revolutionary military leader.  Macaya was one of the first black rebel leaders in Saint-Domingue to ally himself with the French Republican commissioners Sonthonax and Polverel.  He helped to lead forces that recaptured Cap-Français on behalf of the French Republicans.

Macaya was born in west-central Africa, probably in the Kingdom of Kongo, and taken to the French colony of Saint-Domingue as a slave.  After the outbreak of the 1791 slave rebellion in northern Saint-Domingue, Macaya became a lieutenant of an elderly rebel commander named Pierrot.  Pierrot's rebel forces were based in the hills outside of Le Cap (Cap Francaise), near Bréda plantation by 1793. In that year a conflict developed between the Republican French commissioners Sonthonax and Polverel, and the recently arrived French military governor Francois-Thomas Galbaud du Fort.  The commissioners eventually had Galbaud arrested and imprisoned on a ship in Le Cap's harbor.  There Galbaud was surrounded by other political prisoners and disaffected sailors, who eventually convinced him to attempt a coup against the commissioners.  Galbaud's supporters attacked Le Cap twice on two consecutive days.  On the second day they succeeded in taking control of the city.  Sonthonax and Polverel were forced to take refuge outside the city.

There they began to seek support from the several-thousand strong rebel forces nearby led by Pierrot and Macaya.  These leaders accepted the commissioners' offers of official recognition of their freedom and French citizenship in return for military aid against Galbaud's forces in Le Cap.  Pierrot and Macaya's forces invaded Le Cap and defeated Galbaud's supporters, retaking the town for the Republicans.  This incident marked the beginning of the Republican commissioners' escalating dependence on military support from former slaves, which ultimately helped to inspire the general emancipation decrees in the colony.  The commissioners' unilateral abolition of slavery in Saint-Domingue, in turn, was accepted by the French National Convention, and extended to the other French American colonies.

In an attempt to recruit the major rebel leaders to the French Republican side, the commissioners sent Macaya as an emissary to the two most powerful rebel slave commanders in the north, Biassou and Jean-Francois.  At the time these two leaders were allied with French royalists and Spain.  But instead of convincing these two leaders to join the Republicans, Macaya himself defected to the royalist side.  He issued a statement declaring his loyalty to the kings of France, Spain, and Kongo, who he described as the descendants of the biblical magi.  Macaya may have been raised as a Catholic or exposed to Catholicism in Kongo.

After Toussaint Louverture rose to power, Macaya had a sometimes tense relationship with the colony's most powerful military leader.  At one point in time Louverture had Macaya imprisoned.  Later on, however, in 1802, Macaya fought Leclerc's French army on behalf of Louverture.  After most leading black generals in Saint-Domingue surrendered to the French or began to actively collaborate with them, Macaya continued to resist.  His forces held the Limbé region in the colony's northern province.  Macaya's rebel forces suffered serious losses at the hands of Haiti's future emperor, Dessalines, in early August 1802, when the latter was still fighting on behalf of the French.

Notes

Sources
Robin Blackburn.  The Overthrow of Colonial Slavery 1776-1848.  London / New York: Verso, 2000.
Laurent Dubois.  The Avengers of the New world: The Story of the Haitian Revolution.  Cambridge, Massachusetts / London, England: The Belknap Press of Harvard University Press.
Laurent Dubois and John D. Garrigus (editors).  Slave Revolution in the Caribbean 1789-1804: A Brief History with Documents.  Boston / New York: Bedford / St. Martin's, 2006.

Haitian Revolution
Haitian rebels
18th-century Kongo people
19th-century Kongo people
18th-century Haitian people
19th-century Haitian people
People of Saint-Domingue